Roger R. Schell is president of ÆSec, a company focused on appliances built on hardened platforms for secure, reliable e-business on the Internet. For several years he managed the development and delivery of security for several Novell releases of network software products including an integral PKI, an international crypto API, and an authentication service with exposed SSL capability. Dr. Schell was co-founder and vice president for Engineering of Gemini Computers, Inc., where he directed development of Gemini's Class A1 network processor commercial product. He was also the founding deputy director of the (now) National Computer Security Center. Previously he was an associate professor of computer science at the Naval Postgraduate School.

Biography
Schell was born in Richey, Montana, where he spent the earliest years of his life. As he was entering his junior year of high school, he and his family moved to Belgrade, Montana. After Schell finished high school, he attended Montana State University (MSU), where he graduated from the ROTC program and received a degree in electrical engineering. At MSU, Schell decided to accept sponsorship from the U.S. Air Force to attend graduate school at Washington State University (WSU), passing over a full fellowship offer from Stanford University. At WSU, Schell earned a master's degree in electrical engineering in 1963.

After Schell finished his master's degree at WSU, the Air Force assigned him to the Electronics Systems Division at Hanscom Air Force Base in Bedford, Massachusetts. At Hanscom, Schell worked with the Air Force on its Ballistic Missile Early Warning System, which was a missile detection system. After Schell finished his work on the project, he was then assigned to work on the Semi-Automatic Ground Environment (SAGE) system, which was designed to semi-automate the radar sites. During this work on the SAGE system, Schell became much more involved in computer programming.

As a skilled engineer working for the Air Force, Schell was constantly pressured during these years to return to graduate school, where he could advance his education. At the time, he was able to persuade his officers to send him to MIT. In 1971, Schell graduated from MIT with a PhD in computer science.

During his life, Schell originated several security design and evaluation techniques and holds patents in cryptography and authentication. He has been referred to as the "father" of the Trusted Computer System Evaluation Criteria (the "Orange Book"). The NIST and NSA have recognized Dr. Schell with the National Computer System Security Award.

Publications
 
 
 Karger, Paul A. and Roger R. Schell (2002). “Thirty Years Later: Lessons from the Multics Security Evaluation”, ACSAC '02 Proceedings of the 18th Annual Computer Security Applications Conference
 
 Schell, Roger R. (January–February 1979). “Computer Security: The Achilles' Heel of the Electronic Air Force?” Air University Review 30(2)

Notes

References
 Roger R. Schell, oral history interview by Jeffrey R. Yost (May 1, 2012). Charles Babbage Institute, University of Minnesota.

Further reading

External links
 Past NCSSA Winners

Living people
MIT School of Engineering alumni
Naval Postgraduate School faculty
Computer security academics
People from Dawson County, Montana
People from Belgrade, Montana
Montana State University alumni
Washington State University alumni
Year of birth missing (living people)